Fort Niobrara National Wildlife Refuge is located in the U.S. state of Nebraska and includes 19,131 acres (77.42 km2). The refuge borders the Niobrara National Scenic River on the west and is managed by the U.S. Fish and Wildlife Service. From 1879 to 1906, the Fort Niobrara Military Reservation was located on what later became refuge lands to house a garrison of the U.S. Cavalry. After the fort was closed, the effort to preserve the region as a wildlife refuge culminated in the creation of the refuge on January 11, 1912. The refuge also manages Valentine and John and Louise Seier National Wildlife Refuges as parts of the Fort Niobrara National Wildlife Refuge Complex.

The reservation was created by Executive order in 1912:
January 11, 1912. Niobrara Reservation. Embracing parts of townships thirty-three and thirty-four north, ranges twenty-six and twenty-seven west, Sixth Principal Meridian, Nebraska, the same being a part of the abandoned Fort Niobrara Military Reservation. This reservation was enlarged by executive order of November 14, 1912, adding approximately nine hundred acres, which included the building and old parade-grounds of the military reservation.

Fort Niobrara NWR is located along the banks of the Niobrara River in Cherry County. The river has eroded into the limestone, creating cliffs and a varied topography. This unusual alteration to the otherwise relatively featureless great plains presents a unique habitat that fosters numerous plant and animal species. The American Bison Society brought a bison herd to the reservation in 1913 in an effort to repopulate the region with original animal species. Over 230 species of birds have been documented, along with a 350 bison and a small herd of elk (wapiti) that have been restored to the refuge.  of the refuge was designated as the Fort Niobrara Wilderness in 1976.

References

External links
 
 
 

Protected areas of Cherry County, Nebraska
National Wildlife Refuges in Nebraska
Protected areas established in 1912
1912 establishments in Nebraska